Allari is a 2002 Indian Telugu-language romantic comedy film produced and directed by Ravi Babu under the Flying Frogs banner, the film stars Naresh, Swetha Agrawal and Nilambari in their debuts.

Allari was released on 10 May 2002 and was a box office success. Naresh who became popular with this film, eventually prefixed the title Allari to his name. The film was remade in Tamil as Kurumbu. The film is loosely based on 1987 American teen romantic drama film Some Kind of Wonderful.

Activity 

This is a story about a young man Ravi (Naresh) who belongs to a middle-class family. His father (Kota Srinivasa Rao), runs a small business and is quite tight fisted when it comes to money. Ravi's best friend Aparna "Apu" (Shweta Agarwal), lives in the same building as Ravi. Apu and Ravi have grown up together and share a very special friendship and Apu has always been there for Ravi whenever he needed anything (especially  "money"). Both Ravi and Apu take each other for granted and are unaware of their feelings for each other.

Ravi has a crush on a new neighbour, Ruchi (Nilambari) who has recently moved into the flat opposite of his flat. Ruchi enjoys all the attention and gifts she receives from the opposite sex and is quite a flirt. Ravi who believes he is deeply in love with Ruchi, writes a love letter to her and requests Apu to pass it on to Ruchi without revealing the source. Apu reads the letter and finds the content of the letter very childish. She re-writes the love letter making it more expressive and passes it on to Ruchi. The letter has the desired effect on Ruchi and she loves the idea of having a secret admirer.

One fine day, Ravi introduces himself as the person who has written the love letter and they start dating each other. The love letter (which was not destroyed) accidentally changes a few hands and leads to many misunderstandings and confusion, especially between Ruchi's father and Ravi's mother. Apu starts feeling lonely and hurt and feels bad for her best friend who was so blind to the truth and during this period she realizes her true feelings towards Ravi. The last act comes, when Ruchi invites Ravi to her place saying that she was all alone and that she wants to give a "special gift" to him on her birthday. Before Ruchi bestows her "special gift" upon Ravi, their parents storm into the flat and it leads to a comical mayhem which ends with each character waking up to their own folly. Apu in the meantime has got into a medical college and was leaving town. Ravi gets a chance to read the letter he had written to Ruchi and realizes that it was Apu who had written the letter to prevent him making a fool of himself. The movie ends with Ravi being forgiven by Apu after he honestly expresses how he feels about her.

Cast 
 Naresh as Ravi
 Shweta Agarwal as Aparna "Appu"
 Nilambari as Ruchi
 Chalapathi Rao as Visweswara Rao, Ruchi's father
 Subhashini as Sujatha, Ruchi's mother
 Kota Srinivasa Rao as Mahabala Rao, Ravi's father
 Apoorva as Sumati, Ravi's mother
 Tanikella Bharani as Apartment Secretary
 Sudha as Aparna's mother
 Lakshmipati as Simpiri, Lift boy cum Gardener
 Kalpana Rai
 Baby Satya Gayatri as Ravi's sister
 Sanjay

Soundtrack

The music  of the film was composed by Paul J.

The music director used offbeat instruments (like Tabla, flute etc.) in the background.

There are five songs in the film. All songs are written by Sirivennela. Three of them are situational songs and two of them are dream songs (duets). The canning of duets is in MTV song picturization format.

Reception 
Sify gave three out of five stars, and praised Naresh for his performance. Idlebrain.com, giving four out of five, wrote that "Allari is a good film and it should be appreciated well so that we can see new talent making films with innovative themes."

References

External links
 

2002 directorial debut films
2002 films
Telugu films remade in other languages
2000s Telugu-language films
Films directed by Ravi Babu